William Williams (13 September 1925 – 7 July 2016) was an Australian rules footballer who played with South Melbourne in the Victorian Football League (VFL) during the late 1940s.

A rover, Williams won the best and fairest award for South in 1946, 1947 and 1950. A handy goalkicker, he twice topped their season ending list for goals.

He joined Williamstown as captain-coach in 1952.

In 2003 he was named on the interchange bench in the club's official Team of the Century.

Williams died 7 July 2016 aged 90.

References

External links

1925 births
Australian rules footballers from Victoria (Australia)
Sydney Swans players
Bob Skilton Medal winners
Spotswood Football Club players
Williamstown Football Club players
Williamstown Football Club coaches
2016 deaths